St-Blaise CFF railway station is a railway station in the municipality of Saint-Blaise, in the Swiss canton of Neuchâtel. It is an intermediate stop on the standard gauge Jura Foot line of Swiss Federal Railways.

Services
The following services stop at St-Blaise CFF:

Gallery

References

External links 
 

Railway stations in the canton of Neuchâtel
Swiss Federal Railways stations